Matleena Kuusniemi (born 24 September 1973) is a Finnish actress. She attended the Helsinki Theatre Academy in the 1990s, and has since starred in several films and on television. Kuusniemi is known for her role as Pauliina Sorjonen in the television series Bordertown., and in 2016, she won Golden Venla for her role in the television series Koukussa.

Personal life
Kuusniemi has two children and lives with Antti Mansikkamäki.

Selected filmography

References

External links 

1973 births
Living people
Finnish film actresses
Finnish television actresses
20th-century Finnish actresses
21st-century Finnish actresses
People from Nummi-Pusula